Petar Bručić (born 28 June  1953 in Jarmina, FPR Yugoslavia) is a Croatian retired football midfielder who played for several Croatian and foreign football clubs.

External links
Profile at Rapidarchiv

Profile at Bundesliga

1953 births
Living people
People from Vukovar-Srijem County
Association football midfielders
Yugoslav footballers
HNK Cibalia players
GNK Dinamo Zagreb players
SK Rapid Wien players
Wiener Sport-Club players
Yugoslav First League players
Austrian Football Bundesliga players
Yugoslav expatriate footballers
Expatriate footballers in Austria
Yugoslav expatriate sportspeople in Austria